Wieland Speck (* 1951 in Freiburg im Breisgau) is a German film director, who since 1992 has coordinated "Panorama" at the International Filmfestival Berlin (Berlinale). Panorama showcases new films by established directors, as well as debut works by up-and-coming talents.

Biography
Since 1972, he started living in Berlin. He studied German, Theater and Ethnology at the Free University of Berlin. Since the mid-1970s, Speck has been engaged in various areas of film and video as well as author and publisher.

In the late 1970s, he was managing director of the Tali-Kino, an independent arthouse cinema in Berlin-Kreuzberg (later called "Moviemento").
From 1979 to 1981 he completed a film study at the San Francisco Art Institute.

Between 1982 and 1992 Speck worked with the German film director Manfred Salzgeber producing LGBT-themed films and shorts. He is the co-creator of the Teddy Award, (with Manfred Salzgeber) which since 1987 was awarded to LGBT films at the Berlinale.

Openly gay, he has lived in Berlin since 1972. Speck studied German, theater and ethnology at the Freie Universität Berlin.

In 1985, he produced his first feature film Westler.

He was a panel member of the Berlin State Film Fund (1990-1993) and the Hamburg Film Fund (1994-1998) and from 1992 to 2017 he was head of the Panorama section of the Berlinale.

In 2011 he won the Nino Gennaro Award at the first edition of Sicilia Queer filmfest.

In 2015, Speck won the 20th Busan International Film Festival, Korean Cinema Award.

In 2017, he became a consultant on the Berlinale official program.

Filmography
As an actor;

As a Director;

Awards
 2010: Federal Cross of Merit
 2011: Nino Gennaro Award ( Sicilia Queer filmfest )
 2019: Berlinale Camera

References

External links 
 
  - interview over history and past of LGBT cino

1951 births
German gay actors
German gay writers
Living people
Film people from Berlin
Recipients of the Cross of the Order of Merit of the Federal Republic of Germany
Recipients of the Order of Merit of Berlin
Film people from Freiburg im Breisgau
German film actors
German film directors
German male screenwriters
German LGBT screenwriters
LGBT film directors
Gay screenwriters